The Strad is a UK-based monthly classical music magazine about string instrumentsprincipally the violin, viola, cello and double bassfor amateur and professional musicians. Founded in 1889, the magazine provides information, photographs and reviews of instruments, related feature articles and news, and information about concerts. The magazine offers practical advice on technique, profiles of leading performers, and information on master classes and the craft of instrument makers such as luthiers. It also includes articles about orchestras and music schools.

The magazine's name references the common abbreviation for the famous 17th18th-century Stradivarius family of luthiers and their coveted and valuable instruments. The Strad's first issue was released in June 1890. It is now edited by Emma Baker  and owned by Newsquest Specialist Media Limited, a Gannett company.

References

External links
Official site

1890 establishments in the United Kingdom
Classical music magazines
Magazines established in 1890
Magazines published in London
Monthly magazines published in the United Kingdom
Music magazines published in the United Kingdom